Prothelymna antiquana is a species of moth in the family Tineidae first described by Francis Walker in 1863. This species is endemic to New Zealand.

References

Schoenotenini
Moths described in 1863
Moths of New Zealand
Endemic fauna of New Zealand
Taxa named by Francis Walker (entomologist)
Endemic moths of New Zealand